Juan Nazario (born September 27, 1963 in Guaynabo, Puerto Rico) is a former professional boxer. During his career, which lasted from 1982 to 1993, Nazario won the WBA world lightweight title. His first world title challenge came in 1987 when he fought fellow Puerto Rican Edwin Rosario for the WBA belt, Rosario won the fight by an eighth round knockout. Nazario and Rosario fought a rematch in 1990, once again for the WBA title. Nazario was able to reverse the result of the first fight by beating Rosario in the eighth round to become champion. In his first defense Nazario challenged Pernell Whitaker for the undisputed title. Whitaker won the fight in the first round and Nazario never fought for a world title again. Nazario fought for a final time on July 10, 1993, beating Angel Cordova by unanimous decision.

Professional boxing record

External links

1963 births
Living people
People from Guaynabo, Puerto Rico
Lightweight boxers
World Boxing Association champions
Puerto Rican male boxers